I Am Alive in Everything I Touch is the eighth studio album by Canadian post-hardcore band Silverstein. The album was released on May 19, 2015 through Rise Records (worldwide) and New Damage Records (Canada).

Music and lyrics
Similar to A Shipwreck in the Sand (2009) and This Is How the Wind Shifts (2013), I Am Alive in Everything I Touch is a conceptual album penned by lyricist and lead vocalist Shane Told. The album is split into 4 chapters: "Borealis" (North), "Austeralis" (South), "Zephyrus" (West) and "Eurus" (East). Each track's setting is a different city that geographically falls into that region, with real life recordings of each city incorporated into the songs. Told had this to say about the album:

Recording

The album was recorded with producer Jordan Valeriote.

Release
On January 13, 2015 A music video for "A Midwestern State of Emergency" was released alongside the song's streaming release and coincided with the official announcement of I Am Alive in Everything I Touch. The music video was directed by Max Moore and produced by Nolan Cubero. The video begins with Shane Told (lead vocalist) in a bath of water, seemingly dead. He resuscitates as the music begins and the band can be seen playing throughout – with Told subsequently singing to himself in many places. The music video ends in the same place it begins, only with Told now on the floor spluttering water out.

A lyric video for the song "Milestone" was released on March 4, 2015. This video consists of footage from Silverstein's Discovering the Waterfront 10th anniversary tour as well as images of highways and buildings. This is all overlaid by the lyrics of the song. On May 11, the music video for "Face of the Earth" was released. On May 12, the album was available for streaming, and was released on May 19 on Rise. In November and December, the band went on a co-headlining US tour with Senses Fail. They were supported by Hundredth and Capsize.

Reception

Jonathan Diener of Alternative Press said that the album's concept didn't "overshadow" the compositions. He named "A Midwestern State of Emergency" as the group's "best work", showing off their combination of screaming verses flowing into "huge singalong choruses". He also said that "Late on 6th" broke the flow so that "monotony never sets in".

The album was included on The Noise's "The 27 Best Albums Of 2015 So Far" list.

Track listing

Personnel

Silverstein
 Shane Told – lead vocals
 Paul Koehler – drums
 Josh Bradford – rhythm guitar
 Billy Hamilton – bass
 Paul Marc Rousseau – lead guitar

Production
 Jordan Valeriote – producer, mixing, engineer
 Chris Cosentino - engineer
 Joao Carvalho - mastering
 Paul Dickinson - drum tech
 Michael Colasardo - album layout
 Anna Lee - band photography
 Billy Hamilton - additional photography
 Martin Wittfooth – album illustrations
 Anna Jarvis - cello

Chart positions

References
Footnotes

Citations

External links

I Am Alive in Everything I Touch at YouTube (streamed copy where licensed)

2015 albums
Silverstein (band) albums
Rise Records albums
Albums recorded at Metalworks Studios